Daniel Fitzgerald is a baseball coach and former player, who is the current head baseball coach of the Kansas Jayhawks. He played college baseball for the St. Thomas Tommies and the Wisconsin-River Falls Falcons He served as the head coach of the Des Moines Area Bears (2008–2012).

Playing career
Fitzgerald grew up in Edina, Minnesota, where he attended Edina High School. He attended the University of St. Thomas (Minnesota) and played for the Tommies

Coaching career
Fitzgerald began his coaching career as a volunteer assistant for the Iowa Hawkeyes. He moved to North Iowa Area Community College where he was an assistant, while also holding the roles of housing head resident and intramural coordinator for the 2003 and 2004 seasons. He was an assistant on Dave Barnett's staff for the Flagler Saints in 2005 and 2006. He would spend the 2007 season as an assistant coach for the Des Moines Area Bears, before being promoted to head coach starting with the 2008 season. He led the Bears to a 249–73 record and to the JUCO World Series in 4 of 5 seasons (2008–2012) as the head coach.

Fitgerald joined Dan Heefner's staff as an assistant coach and recruiting coordinator of the Dallas Baptist in 2012. Prior to the 2017 season, he was promoted to associate head coach. After 9 years on Heefner's staff, he accepted the recruiting coordinator position with the LSU Tigers.

On June 15, 2022, Fitzgerald was named the 19th head coach of the Kansas Jayhawks.

Head coaching record

References

External links
Kansas Jayhawks bio

Living people
Dallas Baptist Patriots baseball coaches
DMACC Bears baseball coaches
Flagler Saints baseball coaches
Iowa Hawkeyes baseball coaches
Kansas Jayhawks baseball coaches
LSU Tigers baseball coaches
NIACC Trojans baseball coaches
St. Thomas (Minnesota) Tommies baseball players
Wisconsin–River Falls Falcons baseball players
Year of birth missing (living people)
Dallas Baptist University alumni
University of Minnesota alumni
Sportspeople from Edina, Minnesota
Baseball coaches from Minnesota